In the Room may refer to:
 In the Room (film), a 2015 erotic drama film directed by Eric Khoo
 "In the Room", an episode of The West Wing (season 6)
 "In the Room", a 2019 song by twlv